Jazz in Marciac (JIM) is a jazz festival that takes place in Marciac, Occitania, France. The festival takes place over a period of three weeks, usually from late July to mid-August. The first festival took place in 1978.

Programs 
The festival has hosted many internationally renowned musicians such as:

References

External links 
 Official Site

Jazz festivals in France
Midi-Pyrénées
Gers